Matthew Peter Headrick (born ca. 1973) is an American physicist who is an Associate Professor of Physics at Brandeis University. He received his PhD from Harvard University in 2002 under Shiraz Minwalla and his A.B from Princeton University in 1994. Headrick is known for his contributions to the quantum information perspective on holography.

Headrick is notable as the 1990 winner of the Intel (then Westinghouse) Science Talent Search while a high school student at the University of Chicago Laboratory Schools, an event that generated intense media coverage. He appeared on talk shows including Today. In response to the award, then-Illinois Gov. Thompson declared a "Matthew Headrick Day" and the US House of Representatives also made a proclamation.

Selected publications

See also 
 List of University of Chicago Laboratory Schools people

References

Further reading

External links
 

1970s births
Brandeis University faculty
Living people
Princeton University alumni
People from Massachusetts
21st-century American physicists
Harvard University alumni
People from Chicago
University of Chicago Laboratory Schools alumni
Peace Corps volunteers
MIT Center for Theoretical Physics alumni